Fred A. Huber Jr. was one of the founders of the International Hockey League. He worked as the Director of Public Relations for the Detroit Red Wings. The Fred A. Huber Trophy is named in his honour. He was publicist for the Red Wings during their years as major contenders for the Stanley Cup during the 1950s. Huber is a Past President of the Detroit Sports Medias Association and a lifetime member. He was also one of the organizers of the Michigan Amateur Hockey Association and served as president in 1962.

References

External links
Picture of Fred Huber's Name on the 1950 Stanley Cup Plaque
Picture of Fred Huber's Name on the 1952 and 1954 Stanley Cup Plaques

Detroit Red Wings executives
Stanley Cup champions